The Queen Elizabeth II Bridge is a bridge across the River Thames, England. Along with two tunnels, it forms part of the Dartford Crossing.

Queen Elizabeth II Bridge may also refer to:

Queen Elizabeth II Bridge, Belfast, in Belfast, Northern Ireland
Queen Elizabeth II Bridge, Newcastle upon Tyne, a railway bridge across the River Tyne, England
Queen Elizabeth II Bridge, British Virgin Islands, connecting Beef Island to Tortola in the British Virgin Islands

See also
Queen Elizabeth Bridge, Windsor, in Windsor, England